The 2017–18 Southern Utah Thunderbirds women's basketball team represented Southern Utah University during the 2017–18 NCAA Division I women's basketball season. The Thunderbirds were led by fourth-year head coach Chris Boettcher and play their home games at America First Events Center. They were members of the Big Sky Conference. They finished the season 3–27, 1–15 in Big Sky play to finish in last place. They lost in the first round of the Big Sky women's tournament to Idaho State.

On March 13, Chris Boettcher was fired. He finished at Southern Utah with a 4 year record of 29–92. On April 18, former Saint Mary's assistant coach Tracy Sanders was named the next head coach at Southern Utah.

Roster

Schedule and results

|-
!colspan=9 style=| Exhibition

|-
!colspan=9 style=| Non-conference regular season

|-
!colspan=9 style=| Big Sky regular season

|-
!colspan=9 style=| Big Sky Women's Tournament

See also
 2017–18 Southern Utah Thunderbirds men's basketball team

References

2017-18 team
Southern Utah
2018 in sports in Utah
2017 in sports in Utah